Pieczyska  is a village in the administrative district of Gmina Wieruszów, within Wieruszów County, Łódź Voivodeship, in central Poland.

References

Villages in Wieruszów County